Kattode is a settlement in Tiruvalla Kerala state, in India. It is a part of Thiruvalla Taluk /Municipality ml:തിരുവല്ല താലൂക്ക് .

Location
Kattode is situated on the Sabarimala pilgrimage route on the Thiruvalla - Kumbazha road (TK road / Sh-07).

Demographics
The major religions of the population are Hinduism and Christianity.

Post Office
There is a post office in Kattode and the pin code is 689105.

Schools

Educational institutions in & around

 Nicholson Syrian Girls High School, Meenthalakara
 Mar Thoma Sevika Sangham K.G & U. P. School, Meenthalakara

Places of worship
 Meenthalakara Ayyappa temple
 St Marys Knanaya Church
 St. Mary's Catholic Church, Kattode
 Christos Mar Thoma Church 
Meenthalakara
Assemblies of God Church
India Pentecostal Church of God
 St. Stephen Orthodox Church, Meenthalakara
Ayyappa temple is situated about two-kilometer from the Thiruvalla railway station.
Pathanamthitta District, Kerala, India
is one among the most prominent ayyappa temples in kerala.

Festivals
The main festival is celebrated annually during March/April. 11 days of festival starts with many cultural & traditional programs in subsequent days. The main attraction of this festival is Kaavadiyattam, pallivilakku, pallivetta and aarattu.

The second main festival is Sree Bhagavatha Sapthaha Yagnam, during January or February. This includes detail description of Bhagavatham followed by religious speeches, cultural & traditional programs. 7 days of festival ends with Aarattutsavam.

Mandala pooja conducted for 41 days in the temple.

References

^ "Census of India 2001: Data from the 2001 Census, including cities, villages and towns (Provisional)".Census Commission of India. Archived from the original on 2004-06-16. Retrieved 2008-11-01.

External links 
 Thiruvalla

Villages in Pathanamthitta district